Andy Cruz Gómez (born 12 August 1995) is a Cuban boxer. He has won two gold medals at the Pan American Games, as well as three gold medals in the AIBA World Championships. He is the reigning Olympic champion after competing in the 2020 Summer Olympics.

References

External links
  (archive)
 

1995 births
Living people
Sportspeople from Matanzas
Cuban male boxers
Pan American Games gold medalists for Cuba
Pan American Games medalists in boxing
Boxers at the 2015 Pan American Games
Boxers at the 2019 Pan American Games
AIBA World Boxing Championships medalists
Light-welterweight boxers
Lightweight boxers
World lightweight boxing champions
World light-welterweight boxing champions
Medalists at the 2019 Pan American Games
Medalists at the 2015 Pan American Games
Boxers at the 2020 Summer Olympics
Olympic boxers of Cuba
Medalists at the 2020 Summer Olympics
Olympic medalists in boxing
Olympic gold medalists for Cuba
21st-century Cuban people